The 2018 Florida Atlantic Owls football team represented Florida Atlantic University in the 2018 NCAA Division I FBS football season. The Owls played their home games at the FAU Stadium in Boca Raton, Florida, and competed in the East Division of Conference USA (C–USA). They were led by second-year head coach Lane Kiffin. They finished the season 5–7, 3–5 in C-USA play to finish in fifth place in the East Division.

Previous season
The Owls finished the 2017 season 11–3, 8–0 in C-USA play to win the East Division title and represented the East Division in the Conference USA Championship Game where they defeated North Texas to be crowned C-USA champions. They were invited to the Boca Raton Bowl, where they defeated Akron.

Preseason

Award watch lists
Listed in the order that they were released

C-USA preseason awards
On July 16, 2018, Conference USA released their preseason awards, including the preseason all-CUSA team. Running back Devin Singletary was selected as the preseason offensive player of the year and linebacker Azeez Al-Shaair was selected as the preseason defensive player of the year. The Owls placed a total of six players of the all-CUSA team.

Offense

Devin Singletary – RB/offensive player of the year

Reggie Bain – OL

Harrison Bryant – TE

Defense

Azeez Al-Shaair – LB/defensive player of the year

Shelton Lewis – DB

Jalen Young – DB

Preseason media poll
Conference USA released their preseason media poll on July 17, 2018, with the Owls predicted to be champions of the East Division.

Schedule

Schedule Source:

Game summaries

at Oklahoma

Air Force

Bethune–Cookman

at UCF

at Middle Tennessee

Old Dominion

at Marshall

Louisiana Tech

at FIU

Western Kentucky

at North Texas

Charlotte

Players drafted into the NFL

References

Florida Atlantic
Florida Atlantic Owls football seasons
Florida Atlantic Owls football